Melhania substricta is a plant in the family Malvaceae, native to East Africa and Yemen.

Description
The elliptic to ovate leaves are tomentose, coloured greenish above. Inflorescences are solitary, or rarely two-flowered. The flowers have bright yellow petals.

Distribution and habitat
Melhania substricta is native to Eritrea, Ethiopia, Kenya, Somalia and Yemen. The species is only known from about ten sites and is considered vulnerable.

References

substricta
Flora of Eritrea
Flora of Ethiopia
Flora of Kenya
Flora of Somalia
Flora of Yemen
Plants described in 2007